Happy Valley is a 1939 novel by Australian author Patrick White. It won the 1941 Australian Literature Society Gold Medal. White did not allow the novel to be republished in his lifetime. Not until 2012 would the book come back into print. White had dedicated the novel to artist Roy De Maistre.

The book owed much to White's experiences as a jackaroo working at Adaminaby in the Snowy Mountains of Southern New South Wales.

References

Novels by Patrick White
1939 Australian novels
Adaminaby
ALS Gold Medal winning works
George G. Harrap and Co. books